ACM Computing Surveys is a quarterly peer-reviewed scientific journal published by the Association for Computing Machinery. It publishes survey articles and tutorials related to computer science and computing. The journal was established in 1969 with William S. Dorn as founding editor-in-chief.

According to the Journal Citation Reports, the journal has a 2021 impact factor of 14.324. In a 2008 ranking of computer science journals, ACM Computing Surveys received the highest rank "A*".

See also
ACM Computing Reviews

References

External links

Computer science journals
Information systems journals
Computing Surveys
Publications established in 1969
Review journals